The Building Act 1984 is a United Kingdom statute consolidating previous legislation concerning the construction process, and the design and specifications for buildings and their component parts, and related matters, in England and Wales. The Welsh Government may make its own Building Regulations under this Act for Wales.

This Building Act does not extend to Scotland or Northern Ireland, which both have similar but differing legislation.

The Building Act permits detailed regulations to be made by the English Secretary of State and/or The Welsh Ministers (of the Senedd). The Building Regulations made under the Building Act have been periodically updated, rewritten or consolidated, with the latest and current version being the Building Regulations 2016.

More minor amendments have been issued, for example in 2019 and 2020 in respect of enhanced Fire Safety measures. (See new Building Regulation 7(2) that placed a urgent ban on the use of combustible materials in external walls, of high-risk buildings - over (six floors) 18m high).

Following the horrific Grenfell Tower Fire of 2017, in which 72 people died in a 24-floor block of flats (without sprinklers and combustible external wall materials had been recently added to the block - for improved energy-efficiency and other building management reasons), an independent review into Building Regulations and fire safety was commissioned by the English Government and chaired by Dame Judith Hackitt. The review's report was published on 17 May 2018.

The English Government surveyed 1,200 recently erected "High Rise" buildings and it was found that far too many were in fact not compliant with the pre-2017 fire safety requirements of the English Building Regulations. The Government has now ordered many of these "dangerous" higher-risk buildings to be "remediated".

The (English) Government has asked many more 'older' high-rise building owners to examine their stock for safety risks. Some 12,000 blocks have now been reviewed.

Local Housing Authorities and Regional Fire Authorities have been instructed to ensure remediation of recently erected blocks is carried out as quickly as possible. (Source: "Fire Safety Order 2005" & the new "Fire Safety Act 2020")

Clauses

Power to make regulations 
S.1 Power to make building regulations

The Secretary of State (or The Welsh Assembly) may for any purposes of :
(a) securing the health, safety, welfare and convenience of persons regards buildings
(b) conserving fuel and power
(c) preventing waste, undue consumption, or contamination of water
(d) protecting or enhancing the environment
(e) facilitating sustainable development or
(f) preventing and detecting crime
make building regulations in respect of:
(a) the design and construction of buildings
(b) the demolition of buildings
(c) services, fittings and equipment provided in or in connection with buildings.

The powers to make Building Regulations have been amended and extended in their scope by two recent Acts of Parliament; the Sustainable and Secure Buildings Act 2004 and the Climate Change and Sustainable Energy Act 2006. The latter Act also alters and extends the enforcement powers of local Building Control authorities, in England and Wales. The Building Act 1984 is to be greatly altered in both its scope and its enforcement powers, by the forthcoming "Building Safety Act 2021".

The legal obligation to ensure controlled building work does comply with the requirements of the "Building Regulations" will to be shared between more defined "individual dutyholders". Enforcement powers will be available for use by a "Building Control Authority" for up to ten years after any offence.

New legislation
On 20 July 2020, a new draft "Building Safety Act" was published, for public consultation, and the Building Safety Bill was introduced into the House of Commons on 5 July 2021. This was enacted into statute law on 28 April 2022 and will greatly alter the scope and remit of the existing legislation.

The bill defines "higher-risk" (high-rise) as those blocks of flats "with 6 floors or more" or those blocks of flats "over 18m high", whichever occurs first.

The new law (Act) heavily amends and extending the "Building Act 1984" and for example, abolishes "Approved Inspectors", creates a single state register for all "building control inspectors" (with 'legal duties' now being at the individual & personal level of professional & legal responsibility), creates a new national Building Safety Regulator (BSR).

The Act creates several new criminal offences - including one of impersonating a "registered building control inspector".

The Act creates new "Building Control Authorities" - initially at the "district" or "unitary" local authority level.

The Act confirms the new national Building Safety Regulator will be a "Building Control Authority" for all "higher-risk" buildings. (Residential buildings with two or more flats over 18m high)

The National Regulator will be the sole "Building control Authority" for 'higher-risk' (high-rise) buildings. All existing and under construction, "higher-risk" (high-rise - over 18m high) buildings are to be transferred to the "National Building Safety Regulator" jurisdiction.

All "higher-risk" buildings will have to register with the BSR and prove (over the whole-lifetime of the building) that they are still safe to use and occupy and monitor the "higher-risk" building's fire and structural safe features and systems, to keep this safety case registered with the national Regulator (for England). Periodic re-registration (with the BSR) will be required for all high-risk buildings.

The new law will also alter the "Architect Registration Board's" operational rules to require all 'architects' to undertake annual CPD and competency training for the whole of the "practising career".

Developers, Designers and Contractors will no longer be able to choose their "regulator".

The national regulator will also have powers to test and/or ban any building material or building product, which it knows is "unsafe" or "non-compliant" with the "requirements of the Building Regulations". The national regulator will also have powers to require all claims made about the performance or nature of a building product or material to be truthful and supported by 'up-to-date' scientific testing.

The devolved Welsh Government has welcomed the (English) draft Building Safety Bill, and will legislate for it to apply (with some Welsh amendments) to future building work within the nation of Wales.

Scotland
Scotland has its own Building (Scotland) Act 2003 and its own Building (Procedures) (Scotland) Regulations 2004.

References

United Kingdom Acts of Parliament 1984
Acts of the Parliament of the United Kingdom concerning England and Wales
Construction in the United Kingdom
Housing legislation in the United Kingdom